Television in Georgia was introduced in 1956, when Georgia was still known as the Georgian SSR.

List of channels
This is a list of television channels that broadcast from Georgia in Georgian.

Public

Private

Most viewed channels

See also
 List of Georgian television series
 Television in the Soviet Union

References

External links
Georgian Public Broadcasting
GPB First Channel